Dil Hai Betaab is a 1993 Indian romance film directed by K. C. Bokadia. The film stars Ajay devgn, Pratibha Sinha and Vivek Mushran.

Cast
 Ajay Devgn as Ajay
 Pratibha Sinha as  Meena
 Vivek Mushran as  Raja
 Mohnish Bahl as  Vikram Singh
 Kader Khan as Parshuram
 Anjana Mumtaz as Mrs. Parshuram
 Alok Nath as  Raja's father
 Rakesh Bedi as Pardesi
 Reema Lagoo as Raja's mother
 Ashok Saraf as Vikram's employee
 Sudhir as Sudhir, Vikram's employee

Soundtrack

References

External links
 

1993 films
1990s Hindi-language films
1990s romance films
Films scored by Laxmikant–Pyarelal
Films directed by K. C. Bokadia